Faiyaz Wasifuddin Dagar is an Indian classical singer of the dhrupad genre and the son of dhrupad singer Ustad Nasir Faiyazuddin Dagar. Since the death of his father and later, his uncle, Wasifuddin has been singing solo. He was awarded the Padma Shri in 2010.

Life and training
Wasifuddin Dagar is the son of the late Ustad Nasir Faiyazuddin Dagar, and the nephew of the late Ustad N. Zahiruddin Dagar, the well-known junior Dagar brothers and therefore a descendant of the legendary HaridasDagar, Tansen's teacher.

The maestro received most of training directly under the tutelage of his father, and younger uncle, the junior Dagars, since he was five years old. Additionally he has had opportunity to receive instructions from his grand uncle, Ustad A. Rahimuddin Dagar, his elder uncle, Ustad Aminuddin Dagar (one of the two the elder Dagar brothers), as well as some of his cousin uncles, Ustad Zia Fariduddin Dagar, Ustad Rahim Fahimuddin Dagar and Ustad H. Sayeeduddin Dagar, all of whom are great exponents of Dhrupad singing.

Between 1989 and 1994, he was groomed by his uncle, Ustad Zahiruddin Dagar, with whom he used to sing jugalbandis (duets).

Major recordings
Wasifuddin Dagar's public career began on 25 February 1989, only a few days after his father's death, when he gave his first performance. He sang with Ustad Zahiruddin Dagar. Wasifuddin's first major recording were in Switzerland, India and Japan, in 1992. He has since recorded in Switzerland, India, and America with major recording labels. A French television company made a film based on their life and music.

Wasifuddin Dagar has toured North America performing dhrupad solo since 2000. He first performed live in New York in 2000, where he gave a rendition of Raga Bihag. He has since performed at the UN, the Smithsonian Institutions, Yale, the City of Chicago, University of Washington, Seattle, Stanford University, University of California, Los Angeles, and several other prestigious venues.  The 2008 spring tour of his ensemble to North America is scheduled for April–June 2008. for A complete list of his recordings is at his website's recording page.

See also
Younger Dagar Brothers

References

External links
Dagarvani.org - Ustad F. Wasifuddin Dagar's official web site 
Dagar.org - The home page of the Mumbai branch of the Dagar family 
Musical Nirvana - Z M Dagar biography at Musical Nirvana
Gundecha Brothers - The Gundecha Brothers' profile of Z M Dagar
NYC Radio Live Podcast featuring a musical interview with Wassifuddin Dagar.  Originally aired in New York City on WKCR 89.9 FM-NY

Video
Z M Dagar video from Robert Garfias site

1969 births
Dagarvani
Hindustani singers
Living people
People from Udaipur
Recipients of the Padma Shri in arts